Keith Rayne is an English former professional rugby league footballer who played in the 1970s, 1980s and 1990s, and coached in the 1990s.

Playing career

Wakefield Trinity
Keith Rayne played right-, in Wakefield Trinity’s 3-12 defeat by Widnes in the 1978–79 Challenge Cup Final during the 1978–79 season at Wembley Stadium, London on Saturday 5 May 1979, in front of a crowd of a crowd of 94,218.

Leeds
In September 1980, Rayne was signed by Leeds for a fee of £35,000.

Keith Rayne played  left-, in Leeds' 18-10 victory over Widnes in the 1983–84 John Player Special Trophy Final during the 1983–84 season at Central Park, Wigan on Saturday 14 January 1984.

Return to Wakefield
In July 1987, Rayne was part of a six-player exchange deal; the Leeds players Mark Conway, Phil Fox, Andy Mason, and Keith Rayne, were transferred to Wakefield Trinity in exchange for John Lyons, and Gary Spencer. During his two spells at Wakefield Trinity, Rayne scored 22 three-point tries and 11 four-point tries.

International honours
Keith Rayne won caps for England while at Wakefield Trinity in 1980 against Wales, and France, and won caps for Great Britain while at Leeds in 1984 against France (2 matches), Australia, and Papua New Guinea.

Coaching career

Club career
Rayne was the coach of Batley from May 1990 to April 1991, during the 1990–91 season.

Personal life
Keith Rayne is the twin brother of the rugby league footballer, Kevin Rayne.

References

Living people
Year of birth missing (living people)
Place of birth missing (living people)
Rugby league props
Rugby league second-rows
English rugby league coaches
English rugby league players
Wakefield Trinity captains
Wakefield Trinity players
Leeds Rhinos players
Batley Bulldogs players
Batley Bulldogs coaches
Doncaster R.L.F.C. players
England national rugby league team players
Great Britain national rugby league team players
Twin sportspeople
English twins